Ruthe Ridder (born June 13, 1929) is an American former politician in the state of Washington. Ridder served in the Washington State Senate as a Democrat from the 35th District from 1974 to 1983. She attended the University of Washington and earned a Bachelor of Science degree in psychology. She served as the King County, Washington Assessor from 1984 to 1992.

References

Living people
1929 births
Women state legislators in Washington (state)
Democratic Party Washington (state) state senators
People from Pullman, Washington
University of Washington College of Arts and Sciences alumni
County assessors in the United States
21st-century American women